Too Tight Henry, born Henry Lee Castle (June 5, 1897 or 1899 – August 16, 1971) was an American blues musician, who recorded four songs for Columbia Records and Brunswick Records in 1928 and 1930.

Biography 
Castle was born in Georgia. He played a twelve-string guitar, a common instrument with Georgia blues musicians at the time. Before moving to and residing in Memphis, Tennessee, he travelled and played music with contemporary blues musicians Blind Blake and Blind Lemon Jefferson. For a period of time in the 1930s, Castle also lived in Helena, Arkansas. In 1928, he recorded two sides for Columbia Records, a two-part song called "Charleston Contest", a song in which Castle talks to himself in different voices and brags about his ability on the guitar. In 1930, he recorded two more sides in Chicago, Illinois for Brunswick Records. These sides show a more relaxed side to Castle, and he is accompanied by a guitarist and a harmonica player.

After these two sessions, he played in Jed Davenport's Beale Street Jug Band.

Castle died in Chicago on August 16, 1971.

Recordings

Recorded October 27, 1928 for Columbia Records in Atlanta, Georgia 
 "Charleston Contest – Part 1" – 14374D
 "Charleston Contest – Part 2" – 14374D

Recorded October 2, 1930 for Brunswick Records 
 "Squinch Owl Moan" – 7189
 "The Way I Do" – 7189

References

1890s births
1971 deaths
American blues guitarists
American male guitarists
American blues singers
Piedmont blues musicians
20th-century American guitarists
African-American guitarists
20th-century African-American male singers